

Events

Pre-1600
 533 – A Byzantine expeditionary fleet under Belisarius sails from Constantinople to attack the Vandals in Africa, via Greece and Sicily (approximate date). 
1307 – Külüg Khan is enthroned as Khagan of the Mongols and Wuzong of the Yuan.
1529 – French forces are driven out of northern Italy by Spain at the Battle of Landriano during the War of the League of Cognac.
1582 – Sengoku period: Oda Nobunaga, the most powerful of the Japanese daimyōs, is forced to commit suicide by his own general Akechi Mitsuhide.

1601–1900
1621 – Execution of 27 Czech noblemen on the Old Town Square in Prague as a consequence of the Battle of White Mountain.
1734 – In Montreal in New France, a  slave known by the French name of Marie-Joseph Angélique is put to death, having been convicted of setting the fire that destroyed much of the city.
1749 – Halifax, Nova Scotia, is founded.
1768 – James Otis Jr. offends the King and Parliament in a speech to the Massachusetts General Court.
1788 – New Hampshire becomes the ninth state to ratify the Constitution of the United States.
1791 – King Louis XVI of France and his immediate family begin the Flight to Varennes during the French Revolution.
1798 – Irish Rebellion of 1798: The British Army defeats Irish rebels at the Battle of Vinegar Hill.
1813 – Peninsular War: Wellington defeats Joseph Bonaparte at the Battle of Vitoria.
1824 – Greek War of Independence: Egyptian forces capture Psara in the Aegean Sea.
1826 – Maniots defeat Egyptians under Ibrahim Pasha in the Battle of Vergas.
1848 – In the Wallachian Revolution, Ion Heliade Rădulescu and Christian Tell issue the Proclamation of Islaz and create a new republican government.
1864 – American Civil War: The Battle of Jerusalem Plank Road begins.
1898 – The United States captures Guam from Spain. The few warning shots fired by the U.S. naval vessels are misinterpreted as salutes by the Spanish garrison, which was unaware that the two nations were at war.
1900 – Boxer Rebellion: China formally declares war on the United States, Britain, Germany, France and Japan, as an edict issued from the Empress Dowager Cixi.

1901–present
1915 – The U.S. Supreme Court hands down its decision in Guinn v. United States 238 US 347 1915, striking down Oklahoma grandfather clause legislation which had the effect of denying the right to vote to blacks.
1919 – The Royal Canadian Mounted Police fire a volley into a crowd of unemployed war veterans, killing two, during the Winnipeg general strike.
  1919   – Admiral Ludwig von Reuter scuttles the German fleet at Scapa Flow, Orkney. The nine sailors killed are the last casualties of World War I.
1921 – The Irish village of Knockcroghery was burned by British forces.
1929 – An agreement brokered by U.S. Ambassador Dwight Whitney Morrow ends the Cristero War in Mexico. 
1930 – One-year conscription comes into force in France.
1940 – World War II: Italy begins an unsuccessful invasion of France.
1942 – World War II: Tobruk falls to Italian and German forces; 33,000 Allied troops are taken prisoner.
  1942   – World War II: A Japanese submarine surfaces near the Columbia River in Oregon, firing 17 shells at Fort Stevens in one of only a handful of attacks by Japan against the United States mainland.
1945 – World War II: The Battle of Okinawa ends when the organized resistance of Imperial Japanese Army forces collapses in the Mabuni area on the southern tip of the main island.
1952 – The Philippine School of Commerce, through a republic act, is converted to Philippine College of Commerce, later to be the Polytechnic University of the Philippines.
1957 – Ellen Fairclough is sworn in as Canada's first female Cabinet Minister.
1963 – Cardinal Giovanni Battista Montini is elected as Pope Paul VI.
1964 – Three civil rights workers, Andrew Goodman, James Chaney and Michael Schwerner, are murdered in Neshoba County, Mississippi, United States, by members of the Ku Klux Klan.
1970 – Penn Central declares Section 77 bankruptcy in what was the largest U.S. corporate bankruptcy to date.
1973 – In its decision in Miller v. California, 413 U.S. 15, the Supreme Court of the United States establishes the Miller test for determining whether something is obscene and not protected speech under the U.S. constitution.
1978 – The original production of Tim Rice and Andrew Lloyd Webber's musical, Evita, based on the life of Eva Perón, opens at the Prince Edward Theatre, London.
1982 – John Hinckley is found not guilty by reason of insanity for the attempted assassination of U.S. President Ronald Reagan.
1989 – The U.S. Supreme Court rules in Texas v. Johnson, 491 U.S. 397, that American flag-burning is a form of political protest protected by the First Amendment.
2000 – Section 28 (of the Local Government Act 1988), outlawing the 'promotion' of homosexuality in the United Kingdom, is repealed in Scotland with a 99 to 17 vote.
2001 – A federal grand jury in Alexandria, Virginia, indicts 13 Saudis and a Lebanese in the 1996 bombing of the Khobar Towers in Saudi Arabia that killed 19 American servicemen.
2004 – SpaceShipOne becomes the first privately funded spaceplane to achieve spaceflight.
2005 – Edgar Ray Killen, who had previously been unsuccessfully tried for the murders of James Chaney, Andrew Goodman, and Mickey Schwerner, is convicted of manslaughter 41 years afterwards (the case had been reopened in 2004).
2006 – Pluto's newly discovered moons are officially named Nix and Hydra.
2009 – Greenland assumes self-rule.
2012 – A boat carrying more than 200 migrants capsizes in the Indian Ocean between the Indonesian island of Java and Christmas Island, killing 17 people and leaving 70 others missing.

Births

Pre-1600
 906 – Abu Ja'far Ahmad ibn Muhammad, Saffarid emir (d. 963)
1002 – Pope Leo IX (d. 1054)
1226 – Bolesław V the Chaste of Poland (d. 1279)
1521 – John II, Duke of Schleswig-Holstein-Haderslev (d. 1580)
1528 – Maria of Austria, Holy Roman Empress (d. 1603)
1535 – Leonhard Rauwolf, German physician and botanist (d. 1596)

1601–1900
1630 – Samuel Oppenheimer, German Jewish banker and diplomat (d. 1703)
1636 – Godefroy Maurice de La Tour d'Auvergne, Duke of Bouillon, French noble (d. 1721)
1639 – (O.S.) Increase Mather, American minister and author (d. 1723)
1676 – (O.S.) Anthony Collins, English philosopher and author (d. 1729)
1706 – John Dollond, English optician and astronomer (d. 1761)
1710 – James Short, Scottish-English mathematician and optician (d. 1768)
1712 – Luc Urbain de Bouëxic, comte de Guichen, French admiral (d. 1790)
1730 – Motoori Norinaga, Japanese poet and scholar (d. 1801)
1732 – Johann Christoph Friedrich Bach, German pianist and composer (d. 1791)
1736 – Enoch Poor, American general (d. 1780)
1741 – Prince Benedetto, Duke of Chablais (d. 1808)
1750 – Pierre-Nicolas Beauvallet, French sculptor and illustrator (d. 1818)
1759 – Alexander J. Dallas, American lawyer and politician, 6th United States Secretary of the Treasury (d. 1817)
1763 – Pierre Paul Royer-Collard, French philosopher and academic (d. 1845)
1764 – Sidney Smith, English admiral and politician (d. 1840)
1774 – Daniel D. Tompkins, American lawyer and politician, 6th Vice President of the United States (d. 1825)
1781 – Siméon Denis Poisson, French mathematician and physicist (d. 1840)
1786 – Charles Edward Horn, English singer-songwriter (d. 1849)
1792 – Ferdinand Christian Baur, German theologian and scholar (d. 1860)
1797 – Wilhelm Küchelbecker, Russian poet and author (d. 1846)
1802 – Karl Zittel, German theologian (d. 1871)
1805 – Karl Friedrich Curschmann, German composer and singer (d. 1841)
  1805   – Charles Thomas Jackson, American physician and geologist (d. 1880)
1811 – Carlo Matteucci, Italian physicist and neurophysiologist (d. 1868)
1814 – Paweł Bryliński, Polish sculptor (d. 1890)
  1814   – Anton Nuhn, German anatomist and academic (d. 1889)
1823 – Jean Chacornac, French astronomer (d. 1873)
1825 – Thomas Edward Cliffe Leslie, Irish economist and jurist (d. 1882)
  1825   – William Stubbs, English bishop and historian (d. 1901)
1828 – Ferdinand André Fouqué, French geologist and academic (d. 1904)
  1828   – Nikolaus Nilles, German Catholic writer and teacher (d. 1907)
1834 – Frans de Cort, Flemish poet and author (d. 1878)
1836 – Luigi Tripepi, Italian theologian (d. 1906)
1839 – Joaquim Maria Machado de Assis, Brazilian author, poet, and playwright (d. 1908)
1845 – Samuel Griffith, Welsh-Australian politician, 9th Premier of Queensland (d. 1920)
  1845   – Arthur Cowper Ranyard, English astrophysicist and astronomer (d. 1894)
1846 – Marion Adams-Acton, Scottish-English author and playwright (d. 1928)
  1846   – Enrico Coleman, Italian painter (d. 1911)
1850 – Daniel Carter Beard, American author and illustrator, co-founded the Boy Scouts of America (d. 1941)
1858 – Giuseppe De Sanctis, Italian painter (d. 1924)
  1858   – Medardo Rosso, Italian sculptor and educator (d. 1928)
1859 – Henry Ossawa Tanner, American-French painter and illustrator (d. 1937)
1862 – Damrong Rajanubhab, Thai historian and author (d. 1943)
1863 – Max Wolf, German astronomer and academic (d. 1932)
1864 – Heinrich Wölfflin, Swiss historian and critic (d. 1945)
1867 – Oscar Florianus Bluemner, German-American painter and illustrator (d. 1938)
  1867   – William Brede Kristensen, Norwegian historian of religion (d. 1953)
1868 – Edwin Stephen Goodrich, English zoologist and anatomist (d. 1946)
1870 – Clara Immerwahr, Jewish-German chemist and academic (d. 1915)
  1870   – Anthony Michell, English-Australian engineer (d. 1959)
  1870   – Julio Ruelas, Mexican painter (d. 1907)
1874 – Jacob Linzbach, Estonian linguist (d. 1953)
1876 – Willem Hendrik Keesom, Dutch physicist and academic (d. 1956)
1880 – Arnold Gesell, American psychologist and pediatrician (d. 1961)
  1880   – Josiah Stamp, 1st Baron Stamp, English economist and civil servant (d. 1941)
1881 – (O.S.) Natalia Goncharova, Russian painter, costume designer, and illustrator (d. 1962)
1882 – Lluís Companys, Spanish lawyer and politician, 123rd President of Catalonia (d. 1940)
  1882   – Adrianus de Jong, Dutch fencer and soldier (d. 1966)
  1882   – Rockwell Kent, American painter and illustrator (d. 1971)
1883 – Feodor Gladkov, Russian author and educator (d. 1958)
1884 – Claude Auchinleck, English field marshal (d. 1981)
1887 – Norman L. Bowen, Canadian geologist and petrologist (d. 1956)
1889 – Ralph Craig, American sprinter and sailor (d. 1972)
1891 – Pier Luigi Nervi, Italian architect and engineer, co-designed the Pirelli Tower and Cathedral of Saint Mary of the Assumption (d. 1979)
  1891   – Hermann Scherchen, German-Swiss viola player and conductor (d. 1966)
1892 – Reinhold Niebuhr, American theologian and academic (d. 1971)
1893 – Alois Hába, Czech composer and educator (d. 1973)
1894 – Milward Kennedy, English journalist and civil servant (d. 1968)
  1894   – Harry Schmidt, German mathematician and physicist (d. 1951)
1896 – Charles Momsen, American admiral, invented the Momsen lung (d. 1967)
1899 – Pavel Haas, Czech composer (d. 1944)
1900 – Georges-Henri Bousquet, French economist and Islamologist (d. 1978)

1901–present
1903 – Hermann Engelhard, German runner and coach (d. 1984)
  1903   – Al Hirschfeld, American caricaturist, painter and illustrator (d. 2003)
1905 – Jacques Goddet, French journalist (d. 2000)
  1905   – Jean-Paul Sartre, French philosopher and author (d. 1980)
1906 – Grete Sultan, German-American pianist (d. 2005)
1908 – William Frankena, American philosopher and academic (d. 1994)
1910 – Aleksandr Tvardovsky, Russian poet and author (d. 1971)
1911 – Irving Fein, American producer and manager (d. 2012)
1912 – Kazimierz Leski, Polish pilot and engineer (d. 2000)
  1912   – Mary McCarthy, American novelist and critic (d. 1989)
  1912   – Vishnu Prabhakar, Indian author and playwright (d. 2009)
1913 – Madihe Pannaseeha Thero, Sri Lankan monk and scholar (d. 2003)
  1913   – Luis Taruc, Filipino political activist (d. 2005)
1914 – William Vickrey, Canadian-American economist and academic, Nobel Prize laureate (d. 1996)
1915 – Wilhelm Gliese, German soldier and astronomer (d. 1993)
1916 – Joseph Cyril Bamford, English businessman, founded J. C. Bamford  (d. 2001)
  1916   – Tchan Fou-li, Chinese photographer (d. 2018)
  1916   – Herbert Friedman, American physicist and astronomer (d. 2000)
  1916   – Buddy O'Connor, Canadian ice hockey player (d. 1977)
1918 – Robert A. Boyd, Canadian engineer (d. 2006)
  1918   – James Joll, English historian, author, and academic (d. 1994)
  1918   – Eddie Lopat, American baseball player, coach, and manager (d. 1992)
  1918   – Dee Molenaar, American mountaineer (d. 2020)
  1918   – Robert Roosa, American economist and banker (d. 1993)
  1918   – Tibor Szele, Hungarian mathematician and academic (d. 1955)
  1918   – Josephine Webb, American engineer 
1919 – Antonia Mesina, Italian martyr and saint (d. 1935)
  1919   – Gérard Pelletier, Canadian journalist and politician (d. 1997)
  1919   – Vladimir Simagin, Russian chess player and coach (d. 1968)
  1919   – Paolo Soleri, Italian-American architect, designed the Cosanti (d. 2013)
1920 – Hans Gerschwiler, Swiss figure skater (d. 2017)
1921 – Judy Holliday, American actress and singer (d. 1965)
  1921   – Jane Russell, American actress and singer (d. 2011)
  1921   – William Edwin Self, American actor, producer, and production manager (d. 2010)
1922 – Joseph Ki-Zerbo, Burkinabé historian, politician and writer (d. 2006)
1923 – Jacques Hébert, Canadian journalist and politician (d. 2007)
1924 – Pontus Hultén, Swedish art collector and historian (d. 2006)
  1924   – Ezzatolah Entezami, Iranian actor (d. 2018)
  1924   – Wally Fawkes, British-Canadian jazz clarinetist and satirical cartoonist (d. 2023)
  1924   – Jean Laplanche, French psychoanalyst and academic (d. 2012)
1925 – Larisa Avdeyeva, Russian mezzo-soprano (d. 2013)
  1925   – Stanley Moss, American poet, publisher, and art dealer
  1925   – Giovanni Spadolini, Italian journalist and politician, 45th Prime Minister of Italy (d. 1994)
  1925   – Maureen Stapleton, American actress (d. 2006)
1926 – Fred Cone, American football player (d. 2021)
  1926   – Conrad Hall, French-American cinematographer (d. 2003)
1927 – Carl Stokes, American lawyer, politician, and diplomat, United States Ambassador to Seychelles (d. 1996)
1928 – Wolfgang Haken, German-American mathematician and academic
  1928   – Fiorella Mari, Brazilian-Italian actress
  1928   – Margit Bara, Hungarian actress (d. 2016)
1930 – Gerald Kaufman, English journalist and politician, Shadow Foreign Secretary (d. 2017)
  1930   – Mike McCormack, American football player and coach (d. 2013)
1931 – Zlatko Grgić, Croatian-Canadian animator, director, and screenwriter (d. 1988)
  1931   – Margaret Heckler, American journalist, lawyer, and politician, 15th United States Secretary of Health and Human Services (d. 2018)
  1931   – David Kushnir, Israeli Olympic long-jumper (d. 2020)
1932 – Bernard Ingham, English journalist and civil servant 
  1932   – Lalo Schifrin, Argentinian pianist, composer, and conductor
  1932   – O.C. Smith, American R&B/jazz singer (d. 2001)
1933 – Bernie Kopell, American actor and comedian
1935 – Françoise Sagan, French author and playwright (d. 2004)
1937 – John Edrich, English cricketer and coach (d. 2020)
1938 – Don Black, English songwriter
  1938   – John W. Dower, American historian and author
  1938   – Michael M. Richter, German mathematician and computer scientist (d. 2020)
1940 – Mariette Hartley, American actress and television personality
  1940   – Michael Ruse, Canadian philosopher and academic
1941 – Aloysius Paul D'Souza, Indian bishop
  1941   – Joe Flaherty, American-Canadian actor, producer, and screenwriter
  1941   – Lyman Ward, Canadian actor
1942 – Clive Brooke, Baron Brooke of Alverthorpe, English businessman and politician
  1942   – Marjorie Margolies, American journalist and politician
  1942   – Henry S. Taylor, American author and poet
  1942   – Flaviano Vicentini, Italian cyclist (d. 2002)
  1942   – Togo D. West, Jr., American soldier, lawyer, and politician, 3rd United States Secretary of Veterans Affairs (d. 2018)
1943 – Eumir Deodato, Brazilian pianist, composer, and producer
  1943   – Diane Marleau, Canadian accountant and politician, Canadian Minister of Health (d. 2013)
  1943   – Brian Sternberg, American pole vaulter (d. 2013)
1944 – Ray Davies, English singer-songwriter and guitarist
  1944   – Jon Hiseman, English drummer (d. 2018)
  1944   – Tony Scott, English-American director and producer (d. 2012)
1945 – Robert Dewar, English-American computer scientist and academic (d. 2015)
  1945   – Adam Zagajewski, Polish author and poet (d. 2021)
1946 – Per Eklund, Swedish race car driver
  1946   – Kate Hoey, Northern Irish-British academic and politician, Minister for Sport and the Olympics
  1946   – Brenda Holloway, American singer-songwriter
  1946   – Trond Kirkvaag, Norwegian actor, director, and screenwriter (d. 2007)
  1946   – Malcolm Rifkind, Scottish lawyer and politician, Secretary of State for Scotland
  1946   – Maurice Saatchi, Baron Saatchi, Iraqi-British businessman, founded M&C Saatchi and Saatchi & Saatchi
1947 – Meredith Baxter, American actress 
  1947   – Shirin Ebadi, Iranian lawyer, judge, and activist, Nobel Prize laureate
  1947   – Michael Gross, American actor
  1947   – Joey Molland, English singer-songwriter and guitarist
  1947   – Wade Phillips, American football coach
  1947   – Fernando Savater, Spanish philosopher and author
1948 – Jovan Aćimović, Serbian footballer and manager
  1948   – Ian McEwan, British novelist and screenwriter
  1948   – Andrzej Sapkowski, Polish author and translator
  1948   – Philippe Sarde, French composer and conductor
1949 – John Agard, Guyanese-English author, poet, and playwright
  1949   – Derek Emslie, Lord Kingarth, Scottish lawyer and judge
1950 – Anne Carson, Canadian poet and academic
  1950   – Joey Kramer, American rock drummer and songwriter
  1950   – Enn Reitel, Scottish actor and screenwriter
  1950   – Trygve Thue, Norwegian guitarist and record producer
  1950   – John Paul Young, Scottish-Australian singer-songwriter
1951 – Jim Douglas, American academic and politician, 80th Governor of Vermont
  1951   – Terence Etherton, English lawyer and judge
  1951   – Alan Hudson, English footballer
  1951   – Nils Lofgren, American singer-songwriter and guitarist 
  1951   – Lenore Manderson, Australian anthropologist and academic
  1951   – Mona-Lisa Pursiainen, Finnish sprinter (d. 2000)
1952 – Judith Bingham, English singer-songwriter
  1952   – Jeremy Coney, New Zealand cricketer and sportscaster
  1952   – Patrick Dunleavy, English political scientist and academic
  1952   – Kōichi Mashimo, Japanese director and screenwriter
1953 – Benazir Bhutto, Pakistani politician, Prime Minister of Pakistan (d. 2007)
  1953   – Augustus Pablo, Jamaican producer and musician (d. 1999)
1954 – Már Guðmundsson, Icelandic economist, former Governor of Central Bank of Iceland
  1954   – Mark Kimmitt, American general and politician, 16th Assistant Secretary, Bureau of Political-Military Affairs
  1954   – Robert Menasse, Austrian author and academic
1955 – Tim Bray, Canadian software developer and businessman
  1955   – Michel Platini, French footballer and manager
1956 – Rick Sutcliffe, American baseball player and broadcaster
1957 – Berkeley Breathed, American author and illustrator
  1957   – Luis Antonio Tagle, Filipino cardinal
1958 – Víctor Montoya, Bolivian journalist and author
  1958   – Gennady Padalka, Russian colonel, pilot, and astronaut
1959 – John Baron, English captain and politician
  1959   – Tom Chambers, American basketball player and sportscaster
  1959   – Marcella Detroit, American singer-songwriter and guitarist 
  1959   – Kathy Mattea, American singer-songwriter and guitarist
1960 – Kate Brown, American politician, 38th Governor of Oregon
  1960   – Karl Erjavec, Slovenian politician
1961 – Manu Chao, French singer-songwriter, guitarist, and producer 
  1961   – Sascha Konietzko, German keyboard player and producer 
  1961   – Joko Widodo, Indonesian businessman and politician, 7th President of Indonesia
  1961   – Kip Winger, American rock singer-songwriter and musician 
  1961   – Iztok Mlakar, Slovenian actor and singer-songwriter 
1962 – Shōhei Takada, Japanese shogi player and theoretician  
  1962   – Viktor Tsoi, Russian singer-songwriter and guitarist  (d. 1990)
1963 – Dario Marianelli, Italian pianist and composer
  1963   – Mike Sherrard, American football player
1964 – David Morrissey, English actor and director
  1964   – Valeriy Neverov, Ukrainian chess player
  1964   – Dimitris Papaioannou, Greek director and choreographer
  1964   – Dean Saunders, Welsh footballer and manager
  1964   – Doug Savant, American actor
1965 – David Beerling, English biologist and academic
  1965   – Yang Liwei, Chinese general, pilot, and astronaut
  1965   – Ewen McKenzie, Australian rugby player and coach
  1965   – Lana Wachowski, American director, producer, and screenwriter
1966 – Gretchen Carlson, American model and TV journalist, Miss America 1989
1967 – Jim Breuer, American comedian, actor, and producer
  1967   – Derrick Coleman, American basketball player and sportscaster
  1967   – Pierre Omidyar, French-American businessman, founded eBay
  1967   – Carrie Preston, American actress, director, and producer
  1967   – Yingluck Shinawatra, Thai businesswoman and politician, 28th Prime Minister of Thailand
1968 – Sonique, English singer-songwriter and DJ
1970 – Eric Reed, American pianist and composer 
1971 – Tyronne Drakeford, American football player
1972 – Nobuharu Asahara, Japanese sprinter and long jumper
  1972   – Neil Doak, Northern Irish cricketer and rugby player
  1972   – Irene van Dyk, South African-New Zealand netball player
1973 – Juliette Lewis, American actress and singer-songwriter 
  1973   – John Mitchell, English guitarist, vocalist and songwriter
1974 – Rob Kelly, American football player
  1974   – Craig Lowndes, Australian race car driver
  1974   – Flavio Roma, Italian footballer
1975 – Brian Simmons, American football player
1976 – Shelley Craft, Australian television host
  1976   – Mike Einziger, American guitarist and songwriter 
  1976   – Nigel Lappin, Australian footballer and coach
1977 – Michael Gomez, Irish boxer
  1977   – Al Wilson, American football player
1978 – Thomas Blondeau, Flemish writer (d. 2013)
  1978   – Matt Kuchar, American golfer
  1978   – Cristiano Lupatelli, Italian footballer
  1978   – Dejan Ognjanović, Montenegrin footballer
  1978   – Rim'K, French rapper
1979 – Kostas Katsouranis, Greek footballer
  1979   – Chris Pratt, American actor
1980 – Michael Crocker, Australian rugby league player and sportscaster
  1980   – Łukasz Cyborowski, Polish chess player
  1980   – Richard Jefferson, American basketball player
  1980   – Sendy Rleal, Dominican baseball player
1981 – Yann Danis, Canadian ice hockey player
  1981   – Garrett Jones, American baseball player
  1981   – Brandon Flowers, American singer-songwriter
  1981   – Brad Walker, American pole vaulter
1982 – Lee Dae-ho, South Korean baseball player
  1982   – William, Prince of Wales
  1982   – Jussie Smollett, American actor and singer
1983 – Edward Snowden, American activist and academic
1985 – Kris Allen, American musician, singer and songwriter
  1985   – Lana Del Rey, American singer-songwriter
  1985   – Sentayehu Ejigu, Ethiopian runner
  1985   – Byron Schammer, Australian footballer
1986 – Kathleen O'Kelly-Kennedy, Australian wheelchair basketball player
  1986   – Hideaki Wakui, Japanese baseball player
1987 – Pablo Barrera, Mexican footballer 
  1987   – Sebastian Prödl, Austrian footballer
  1987   – Dale Thomas, Australian footballer
1988 – Allyssa DeHaan, American basketball and volleyball player
  1988   – Alejandro Ramírez, American chess player
  1988   – Paolo Tornaghi, Italian footballer
  1988   – Thaddeus Young, American basketball player
1989 – Abubaker Kaki, Sudanese runner
1990 – Ričardas Berankis, Lithuanian tennis player
  1990   – Sergei Matsenko, Russian chess player
  1990   – François Moubandje, Swiss footballer
  1990   – Håvard Nordtveit, Norwegian footballer
1991 – Gaël Kakuta, French footballer
1991 – Lee Min-young, South Korean singer-songwriter, actress, and entertainer
1992 – MAX, American singer, songwriter, actor, dancer and model
1994 – Başak Eraydın, Turkish tennis player
1996 – Tyrone May, Australian rugby league player 
1997 – Rebecca Black, American singer-songwriter
  1997   – Derrius Guice, American football player
1999 – Ky Rodwell, Australian rugby league player
2000 – Dylan Brown, New Zealand rugby league player
2001 – Alexandra Obolentseva, Russian chess player
2011 – Lil Bub, American celebrity cat (d. 2019)

Deaths

Pre-1600
 532 – Emperor Jiemin of Northern Wei, former Northern Wei emperor
 866 – Rodulf, Frankish archbishop
 868 – Ali al-Hadi, the tenth Imam of Shia Islam (b. 829)
 870 – Al-Muhtadi, Muslim caliph
 947 – Zhang Li, official of the Liao Dynasty
1040 – Fulk III, Count of Anjou (b. 972)
1171 – Walter de Luci, French-English monk (b. 1103)
1208 – Philip of Swabia (b. 1177)
1305 – Wenceslaus II of Bohemia (b. 1271)
1359 – Erik Magnusson, king of Sweden (b. 1339)
1377 – Edward III of England (b. 1312)
1421 – Jean Le Maingre, French general (b. 1366)
1527 – Niccolò Machiavelli, Italian historian and author (b. 1469)
1529 – John Skelton, English poet and educator (b. 1460)
1547 – Sebastiano del Piombo, Italian painter and educator (b. 1485)
1558 – Piero Strozzi, Italian general (b. 1510)
1582 – Oda Nobunaga, Japanese warlord (b. 1534)
1585 – Henry Percy, 8th Earl of Northumberland (b. 1532)
1591 – Aloysius Gonzaga, Italian saint (b. 1568)
1596 – Jean Liebault, French agronomist and physician (b. 1535)

1601–1900
1621 – Louis III, Cardinal of Guise (b. 1575)
  1621   – Kryštof Harant, Czech soldier and composer (b. 1564)
1622 – Salomon Schweigger, German theologian (b. 1551)
1631 – John Smith, English admiral and explorer (b. 1580)
1652 – Inigo Jones, English architect, designed the Queen's House and Wilton House (b. 1573)
1661 – Andrea Sacchi, Italian painter (b. 1599)
1737 – Matthieu Marais, French author, critic, and jurist (b. 1664)
1738 – Charles Townshend, 2nd Viscount Townshend, English politician, Lord Lieutenant of Ireland (b. 1674)
1796 – Richard Gridley, American soldier and engineer (b. 1710)
1824 – Étienne Aignan, French playwright and translator (b. 1773)
1865 – Frances Adeline Seward, American wife of William H. Seward (b. 1824)
1874 – Anders Jonas Ångström, Swedish physicist and astronomer (b. 1814)
1876 – Antonio López de Santa Anna, Mexican general and politician 8th President of Mexico (b. 1794)
1880 – Theophilus H. Holmes, American general (b. 1804)
1893 – Leland Stanford, American businessman and politician, 8th Governor of California (b. 1824)

1901–present
1908 – Nikolai Rimsky-Korsakov, Russian composer and educator (b. 1844)
1914 – Bertha von Suttner, Austrian journalist and author, Nobel Prize laureate (b. 1843)
1929 – Leonard Trelawny Hobhouse, English sociologist, journalist, and academic (b. 1864)
1934 – Thorne Smith, American author (b. 1892)
1940 – Smedley Butler, American general, Medal of Honor recipient (b. 1881)
  1940   – Édouard Vuillard, French painter (b. 1868)
1951 – Charles Dillon Perrine, American astronomer (b. 1867)
  1951   – Gustave Sandras, French gymnast (b. 1872)
1952 – Wop May, Canadian captain and pilot (b. 1896)
1954 – Gideon Sundback, Swedish-American engineer, developed the zipper (b. 1880)
1957 – Claude Farrère, French captain and author (b. 1876)
  1957   – Johannes Stark, German physicist and academic, Nobel Prize laureate (b. 1874)
1964 – James Chaney, American civil rights activist (b. 1943)
  1964   – Andrew Goodman, American civil rights activist (b. 1943)
  1964   – Michael Schwerner, American civil rights activist (b. 1939)
1967 – Theodore Sizer, American professor of the history of art (b. 1892)
1968 – Constance Georgina Tardrew, South African botanist (b. 1883)
1969 – Maureen Connolly, American tennis player (b. 1934)
1970 – Sukarno, Indonesian engineer and politician, 1st President of Indonesia (b. 1901)
  1970   – Piers Courage, English race car driver (b. 1942)
1976 – Margaret Herrick, American librarian (b. 1902)
1980 – Bert Kaempfert, German conductor and composer (b. 1923)
1981 – Don Figlozzi, American illustrator and animator (b. 1909)
1985 – Hector Boyardee, Italian-American chef and businessman, founded Chef Boyardee (b. 1897)
  1985   – Tage Erlander, Swedish lieutenant and politician, 25th Prime Minister of Sweden (b. 1901)
1986 – Assi Rahbani, Lebanese singer-songwriter and producer (b. 1923)
1987 – Madman Muntz, American engineer and businessman, founded the Muntz Car Company (b. 1914)
1988 – Bobby Dodd, American football coach (b. 1908)
1990 – Cedric Belfrage, English journalist and author, co-founded the National Guardian (b. 1904)
  1990   – June Christy, American singer (b. 1925)
1992 – Ben Alexander, Australian rugby league player (b. 1971)
  1992   – Arthur Gorrie, Australian hobby shop proprietor (b. 1922)
  1992   – Rudra Mohammad Shahidullah, Bangladeshi poet, author, and playwright (b. 1956)
  1992   – Li Xiannian, Chinese captain and politician, 3rd President of the People's Republic of China (b. 1909)
1994 – William Wilson Morgan, American astronomer and astrophysicist (b. 1906)
1997 – Shintaro Katsu, Japanese actor, singer, director, and producer (b. 1931)
  1997   – Fidel Velázquez Sánchez, Mexican trade union leader (b. 1900)
1998 – Harry Cranbrook Allen, English historian (b. 1917)
  1998   – Anastasio Ballestrero, Italian cardinal (b. 1913)
  1998   – Al Campanis, American baseball player and manager (b. 1916)
1999 – Kami, Japanese drummer (b. 1973)
2000 – Alan Hovhaness, Armenian-American pianist and composer (b. 1911)
2001 – John Lee Hooker, American singer-songwriter and guitarist (b. 1917)
  2001   – Soad Hosny, Egyptian actress and singer (b. 1942)
  2001   – Carroll O'Connor, American actor and producer (b. 1924)
2002 – Timothy Findley, Canadian author and playwright (b. 1930)
2003 – Roger Neilson, Canadian ice hockey player and coach (b. 1934)
  2003   – Leon Uris, American soldier and author (b. 1924)
2004 – Leonel Brizola, Brazilian engineer and politician, Governor of Rio de Janeiro (b. 1922)
  2004   – Ruth Leach Amonette, American businesswoman (b. 1916)
2005 – Jaime Sin, Filipino cardinal (b. 1928)
2006 – Jared C. Monti, American sergeant, Medal of Honor recipient (b. 1975)
2007 – Bob Evans, American businessman, founded Bob Evans Restaurants (b. 1918)
2008 – Scott Kalitta, American race car driver (b. 1962)
2010 – Russell Ash, English author (b. 1946)
  2010   – Irwin Barker, Canadian actor and screenwriter (b. 1956)
  2010   – İlhan Selçuk, Turkish lawyer, journalist, and author (b. 1925)
2011 – Robert Kroetsch, Canadian author and poet (b. 1927)
2012 – Richard Adler, American composer and producer (b. 1921)
  2012   – Abid Hussain, Indian economist and diplomat, Indian Ambassador to the United States (b. 1926)
  2012   – Sunil Janah, Indian photographer and journalist (b. 1918)
  2012   – Anna Schwartz, American economist and author (b. 1915)
2013 – James P. Gordon, American physicist and academic (b. 1928)
  2013   – Elliott Reid, American actor and screenwriter (b. 1920)
2014 – Yozo Ishikawa, Japanese politician, Japanese Minister of Defense (b. 1925)
  2014   – Walter Kieber, Austrian-Liechtenstein politician, 7th Prime Minister of Liechtenstein (b. 1931)
  2014   – Wong Ho Leng, Malaysian lawyer and politician (b. 1959)
2015 – Darryl Hamilton, American baseball player and sportscaster (b. 1964)
  2015   – Veijo Meri, Finnish author and poet (b. 1928)
  2015   – Remo Remotti, Italian actor, playwright, and poet (b. 1924)
  2015   – Alexander Schalck-Golodkowski, German soldier and politician (b. 1932)
  2015   – Gunther Schuller, American horn player, composer, and conductor (b. 1925)
2016 – Pierre Lalonde, Canadian television host and singer (b. 1941)
2018 – Charles Krauthammer, American columnist and conservative political commentator (b.1950)

Holidays and observances
Christian feast day:
Alban of Mainz
Aloysius Gonzaga
Engelmund of Velsen
Martin of Tongres
Onesimos Nesib (Lutheran)
June 21 (Eastern Orthodox liturgics)
Day of the Martyrs (Togo)
Father's Day (Egypt, Lebanon, Jordan, Syria, Uganda, Pakistan, United Arab Emirates)
Go Skateboarding Day
International Yoga Day (international)
National Aboriginal Day (Canada)
Solstice-related observances (see also June 20):
Day of Private Reflection (Northern Ireland)
International Surfing Day
National Day (Greenland)
We Tripantu, a winter solstice festival in the southern hemisphere. (Mapuche, southern Chile)
Willkakuti, an Andean-Amazonic New Year (Aymara)
Fête de la Musique
World Humanist Day (Humanism)
World Hydrography Day (international)

References

External links

 
 
 

Days of the year
June